Tini Beg, also known as Dinibeg, was the khan of the Golden Horde from 1341 to 1342.

Biography 
He was born to Öz Beg Khan and his principal wife Taydula Khatun. He was appointed as governor of White Horde in c. 1328. Muslim sources such as Ibn Battuta claimed that he was the most favored son of Ozbeg and was designated as heir. He became the expected heir after his elder brother Timur Beg's death in 1330. The poet Qutb translated Nizami's "Khosrow and Shirin" for Tini Beg and his wife Malika Khatun. During his reign Volhynia was lost to Grand Duchy of Lithuania. Tini Beg was away, fighting against Chagatai raiders on the eastern border or White Horde of Jochid ulus, when his father Öz Beg died in 1341. Tini Beg's younger brother Jani Beg served as regent, aided by their mother Taydula Khatun. In obscure circumstances, Jani Beg had another of Öz Beg's sons, Khiḍr Beg, killed. When Taydula heard that Tini Beg was on his way back to the court in 1342, fearing for Jani Beg, she incited the emirs to kill Tini Beg, at Saray-Jük. Jani Beg succeeded as khan.

Legacy 
Tini Beg was remembered as more suitable man for the throne by Ibn Battuta. He was considered pro-Christian and received some letters from Benedict XII, who encouraged him to convert Christianity.

Marriage 
He had at least two wives:

 Jamila Malika Khatun
 Anushirwan Khatun (m. 1330/1) — daughter of Shaikh Ali Jalayir, brother of Hasan Buzurg

Depiction in modern culture

Films

 He is played by the Russian actor Andrei Panin in the 2012 film of The Horde

See also
 List of Khans of the Golden Horde

References

Sources 
 David Morgan, The Mongols

Year of birth missing
1342 deaths
Mongol Empire Muslims
Khans of the Golden Horde
14th-century monarchs in Europe